This is a list of singles which topped the Irish Singles Chart in 1970.

Note that prior to 1992, the Irish singles chart was compiled from trade shipments from the labels to record stores, rather than on consumer sales.

See also
1970 in music
Irish Singles Chart
List of artists who reached number one in Ireland

1970 in Irish music
1970 record charts
1970